Dominik Bittner (born June 10, 1992) is a German professional ice hockey  defenseman currently playing for Grizzlys Wolfsburg of the Deutsche Eishockey Liga (DEL).

Playing career
Playing with the Jungadler Mannheim, the junior team of the Adler Mannheim, Dominik Bittner won the German junior championships of the German Development League (DNL) in 2008, 2009, and 2010. During the 2010/2011 season, Bittner joined the Mannheim partner team Heilbronner Falken in the 2nd Bundesliga, which is the second highest senior league in Germany.

From the 2nd Bundesliga Bittner went to America, playing for the Everett Silvertips (WHL) for one season. The following season he returned to Mannheim, Germany, now playing for the senior team of Adler Mannheim in the DEL, which is the major ice hockey league in Germany.

After five seasons with Mannheim, Bittner left to sign a two-year contract with fellow DEL outfit Schwenninger Wild Wings on April 21, 2017.

At the conclusion of his contract with the Wild Wings following the 2018–19 season, Bittner was announced to have left the club as a free agent. On March 7, 2019, Bittner agreed to a two-year contract through 2021 to join his third DEL club, Grizzlys Wolfsburg.

International play
Playing for junior Team Germany, Bittner participated at the World U17 Hockey Challenge and the IIHF World U18 Championship in 2009.
In 2010 he moved up with the U20 team to the top 10 Group of the IIHF World U20 Championship and again took part at the U20 Championships in 2011.

In 2012 he took part at the Top Team Sotchi-challenge, when Team Germany and Team Russia encountered each other two times in two days, with Russia winning the first match after penalty and Germany winning one match in regular time.

On 25 January 2022, Bittner was selected to play for Team Germany at the 2022 Winter Olympics.

Career statistics

Regular season and playoffs

International

References

External links

1992 births
Living people
Adler Mannheim players
Everett Silvertips players
German ice hockey defencemen
Grizzlys Wolfsburg players
Heilbronner Falken players
Schwenninger Wild Wings players
People from Weilheim-Schongau
Sportspeople from Upper Bavaria
Ice hockey players at the 2022 Winter Olympics
Olympic ice hockey players of Germany